Santiago Catrofe (born 13 February 1999) is a Uruguayan athlete who competes in cross country running and track and field. He is a multiple Uruguayan national record holder and national champion.

Early life
Having moved to Girona, Spain with his family he has lived in Catalonia since the age of 4 years old. He was competing internationally in the colours of Uruguay at the 2018 under-23 South American Championships, in which he came fourth in the 1500m.

Career
In May 2019 Catrofe finished fourth in the 1500m at the 2019 South American Championships. In Barcelona, in July 2019 Catrofe broke the 30-year old  national 1500m record of Ricardo Vera. Vera was in the stands to see his mark of 3:43.47, which he set in 1989 in Seville, being broken by Catrofe running 3:42.73. Catrofe finished in fourth place at both the 2019 Pan America Games 1500m race in Lima in August 2019.

Catrofe won the bronze medal at the 2021 South American Championships in Athletics 1500m race, running 3.38:67 to finish behind Thiago André, and Federico Bruno. On 31 December 2021 he broke the national 5000m record on the road. In May 2022, he then twice broke the national 5000m record on the track, lowering it first in Nerja, Spain and then on the 22 May 2022 in at the Stadio Olimpico Carlo Zecchini, in Grosseto, Italy to 13:26.78.

On 3 June 2022 at the BoXX United Manchester World Athletics Continental Tour event, Catrofe set a new meet record in winning the 1500m race in a time of 3:40.58. Catrofe qualified for the World Athletics Championships 1500m in Eugene, Oregon, based on his ranking as the 44th out of 45 entrants. However, he far exceeded those expectations qualifying seventh fastest for the semi-finals before finishing 10th in his semi-final and 20th fastest overall.

References

External links

1999 births
Living people
World Athletics Championships athletes for Uruguay
Uruguayan male long-distance runners
Uruguayan male middle-distance runners
Uruguayan cross country runners
20th-century Uruguayan people
21st-century Uruguayan people